On 31 January, at approx. 6:45 A.M, the Malian military cantonment in Niafunké comes under attack by elements of the MNLA. The military camp located in the town undergoes a fierce assault by rebels. A Malian soldier is reported killed. Next military reinforcements nearby are called in for assistance but are ambushed by rebels. After several hours of a standoff the MNLA relinquishes siege of the camp. Military casualties were 4 dead, and 6 wounded. The dead included a Malian army captain. Five MNLA members were killed. Two civilian students also died during the battle by stray bullets.

References

Niafunke
2012 in Mali
January 2012 events in Africa
Niafunke
Niafunke